The following radio stations broadcast on FM frequency 106.2 MHz:

China 
 CNR Easy Radio in Fuzhou, Putian and east of Quanzhou
 CNR The Voice of China in Nanning and Weihai

Israel
 IDC Radio

Malaysia
 Radio IKIM in Johor Bahru, Johor and Singapore

New Zealand
 Flava in Dunedin

Russia
 Europa Plus in Moscow

Taiwan 
 Transfer CNR Easy Radio in Matsu

United Kingdom
 Heart Yorkshire in Barnsley
 Heart Wales in Fishguard
 Heart London
 Sunshine Radio in Hereford
 Mearns FM in Inverbervie
 Radio Skye in Portree
 Salaam Radio in Peterborough
 3FM in Peel

References

Lists of radio stations by frequency